Cindy Guyer is an American model, producer, actress and restaurateur from Stamford, Connecticut.

Early career 
Discovered by Wilhelmina International Inc. (Wilhelmina Models) at the age of 14, Guyer went on to become the most prolific model to be featured on romance novels. She has appeared on hundreds of covers, which earned her the nickname "Miss Romance". The commercial print model and celebrity Playmate was featured in a tribute pictorial in Playboy Magazine for her contribution to this popular genre of fiction literature and millions of book sold worldwide.

In addition to being credited as a cover model for romance novels, she appears on the covers of the Nancy Drew book series. In total, Guyer has appeared on more than 2000 book and magazine covers.

Recent appearances
Since opening Guyer's, a posh eatery and bar (named after her father) on Manhattan‘s Upper Westside, the actress has also made occasional television appearances on reality programs, including The Real Housewives of New York City and the Millionaire Matchmaker.

Guyer was cast in the game-show/reality television series Mr. Romance, which was her debut role in non-scripted programming.

Personal life
Guyer was briefly engaged to actor Corey Haim in 2000. Haim proposed to Guyer two days after they met at a Chicago autograph show. Guyer spoke out about Haim's obsessive behaviour after he allegedly threw her against a car, leaving her needing stitches on her chin. Haim reportedly wept afterwards as he apologized. "I saw a sweet little person in there that really needed help," said Guyer. Fearing his volatile mood swings, she paid to book him into the Betty Ford Center, but Haim left after eight days and their relationship soon disintegrated. Haim began to harass Guyer at her apartment, and she was forced to change her phone number and instruct her doorman not to admit him. "We almost knew it was going to happen," Guyer said of his death. "He had a devil inside him, and the devil was the drug."

Film and television appearances
 The Perfect Nanny (2001) as Mandy
 Hit and Runway (1999) as Model Hostage
 "Martial Law" (1998) as Bunny (1 episode – Lock-Up)
 Summer of Fun (1997)
 The Mirror Has Two Faces (1996) as Taxi Stealer
 Space Ghost Coast to Coast (1994) as herself (1 episode – Punch)
 Soldier's Fortune (1991) (as Cynthia Guyer) as Jennifer
 Cool Blue (1990) as Girl in Gallery
 Psycho Cop (1989) (as Cynthia Guyer) as Julie
 Warm Summer Rain (1989) as Nurse 1
 Jack's Back (1988) as Neighbor
 The Millionaire Matchmaker (Herself)

References

External links
 
 

Living people
Female models from Connecticut
Actresses from Stamford, Connecticut
Romance cover models
1961 births
21st-century American women